Qaracheh Qia (also Romanized as Qarācheh Qīā, Gharacheh Ghiya, Qarah Jāqiah, Qara Jāghīa, Qarājeh Qeyā, and Qarājeh Qīā; also known as Qarājeh Qabā) is a village in Dodangeh-ye Olya Rural District, Ziaabad District, Takestan County, Qazvin Province, Iran. At the 2006 census, its population was 277, in 68 families.

References 

Populated places in Takestan County